The 1997 San Marino Grand Prix was a Formula One motor race held at Autodromo Enzo e Dino Ferrari, Italy  on 27 April 1997. It was the fourth race of the 1997 Formula One season. The 62-lap race was won by Williams driver Heinz-Harald Frentzen after he started from second position. Michael Schumacher finished second for the Ferrari team with his teammate Eddie Irvine third.

Summary

Pre-race
In the early practice sessions the Ferrari and Benetton teams dominated, with a large majority of the field experiencing some sort of problem with their car, or going off.  One of the drivers was David Coulthard, who had a major off in the Saturday morning session, destroying the car.  However, the Williams soon regained the top spot in the later sessions.

Qualifying
Jacques Villeneuve made it four pole positions in a row after once again taking pole. His teammate joined him on the front row, followed by Michael Schumacher, another strong performance by Olivier Panis, and in fifth Michael's younger brother Ralf.

Race

Heinz-Harald Frentzen took his maiden Formula One win driving for Williams after he held off a late charge from Michael Schumacher. Jacques Villeneuve retired from third place with a gearbox failure.

Gerhard Berger started his 200th grand prix, however it ended in disappointment when he spun off early on.

Classification

Qualifying

Race

Championship standings after the race

Drivers'   Championship standings

Constructors'   Championship standings

 Note:   Only the top five positions are included for both sets of standings.

References

Race Details: 

San Marino Grand Prix
San Marino Grand Prix
San Marino Grand Prix
San Marino Grand Prix